Bollineni Hillside is an integrated township spread across 100 acres on Rajiv Gandhi Salai, also called OMR (Old Mahabalipuram Road). It comprises a range of Row Houses & Villas.

Bollineni Hillside will have dwelling space of approximately six million sft. after completion. It will accommodate about 4500 dwelling units suiting to the requirements of different income groups.

Location of Bollineni Hillside
Bollineni Hillside is located off Rajiv Gandhi Salai i.e. OMR (Old Mahabalipuram Road), at Nookampalayam Panchayat. Closest landmark will be Sathyabhama University.

This is one of the best Township in Chennai contains 1000 flats. It has Primary School, BVM-CBSC School and BVM International School in the township itself.

Lot of Township residents activities happen throughout the year.

References

Cities and towns in Kanchipuram district